During the 2000–01 English football season, Sheffield Wednesday F.C. competed in the Football League First Division.

Season summary
Peter Shreeves remained at Sheffield Wednesday for the 2000–01 season as assistant to their new manager Paul Jewell. But Jewell was unable to mount a promotion challenge and he was sacked the following February with the Owls hovering just above the Division One relegation zone. Shreeves was given a permanent contract to take charge of the first team and he guided them to a 17th-place finish.

Final league table

Results summary

Results by round

Results
Sheffield Wednesday's score comes first

Legend

Football League First Division

FA Cup

League Cup

Squad list

Left club during season

Reserve squad

References

Sheffield Wednesday F.C. seasons
Sheffield Wednesday